The seventy-third Minnesota Legislature first convened on January 4, 1983. The 67 members of the Minnesota Senate and the 134 members of the Minnesota House of Representatives were elected during the General Election of November 2, 1982.

Sessions 
The legislature met in a regular session from January 4, 1983 to May 23, 1983. A continuation of the regular session was held between March 6, 1984 and April 24, 1984. There were no special sessions of the seventy-third Minnesota Legislature.

Party summary 
Resignations and new members are discussed in the "Membership changes" section, below.

Senate

House of Representatives

Leadership

Senate 
President of the Senate
Jerome M. Hughes (DFL-Maplewood)

Senate Majority Leader
Roger Moe (DFL-Ada)

Senate Minority Leader
James E. Ulland (IR-Duluth)

House of Representatives 
Speaker of the House
Harry A. Sieben (DFL-Hastings)

House Majority Leader
Until August 1, 1984 Willis Eken (DFL-Twin Valley)
After August 1, 1984 Harry A. Sieben (DFL-Hastings)

House Minority Leader
David M. Jennings (IR-Truman)

Members

Senate

House of Representatives

Membership changes

House of Representatives

References 

 Minnesota Legislators Past & Present - Session Search Results (Session 73, Senate)
 Minnesota Legislators Past & Present - Session Search Results (Session 73, House)

73rd
1980s in Minnesota
1983 in Minnesota
1984 in Minnesota
1983 U.S. legislative sessions
1984 U.S. legislative sessions